Nicholas Wade Howell (born February 26, 1980) is an American football coach.  He is the defensive coordinator and defensive backs coach at Vanderbilt.

Coaching career
Howell began his career coaching high school football. He worked from 2002 to 2006 for Sky View High School, Weber High School, and Ben Lomond High School where he was the head coach. He went to BYU in 2007 as an unpaid defensive intern and became a member of the coaching staff as a graduate assistant in 2008 and later a full-time assistant in 2010. In 2013, BYU coach Bronco Mendenhall promoted Howell to replace him as defensive coordinator.  Following Mendenhall's departure from Brigham Young University in December 2015 Howell followed him to the University of Virginia. Following the end of the 2021 season, Howell was not retained by the new UVA coaching staff. Howell was hired at Vanderbilt in 2022 as their defensive coordinator.

Personal life
Howell grew up in North Ogden, Utah, and graduated in 1998 from Ben Lomond High School, where his father Roger was a longtime high school coach and athletic director. After high School he served a LDS Mission in Brazil. Following his church mission, Howell went to Snow College to play football but his career was cut short when he was injured, so he followed his father into the coaching profession. He earned a bachelor's degree in history from Weber State University and a M.A. from the University of Phoenix. Howell and his wife Brooke have four children.

References

External links
 Virginia profile

1980 births
Living people
BYU Cougars football coaches
Virginia Cavaliers football coaches
Vanderbilt Commodores football coaches
High school football coaches in Utah
Weber State University alumni
Sportspeople from Ogden, Utah
People from North Ogden, Utah
Latter Day Saints from Utah
Latter Day Saints from Virginia
Snow Badgers football players